Dautovo (Dawıt) is a rural locality (a village) in Askarovsky Selsoviet, Abzelilovsky District, Bashkortostan, Russia. The population was 352 as of 2010. There are 17 streets.

Geography 
Dautovo is located 4 km north of Askarovo (the district's administrative centre) by road. Askarovo is the nearest rural locality.

References 

Rural localities in Abzelilovsky District